Monsieur Don't Care is a 1924 American silent comedy film starring Stan Laurel as "Rhubarb Vaselino". The film is a parody of the Rudolph Valentino film Monsieur Beaucaire (1924).

Cast
 Stan Laurel as Rhubarb Vaselino
 Melba Brownrigg

See also
 List of American films of 1924

External links

1924 films
1924 short films
American silent short films
American black-and-white films
American parody films
1924 comedy films
Films directed by Joe Rock
Films directed by Scott Pembroke
Silent American comedy films
American comedy short films
1920s American films